The James William Boggs House is a historic house on Austin Street in Pangburn, Arkansas.  Located on the east side, between Torrence and South McKee Streets, it is a -story rambling wood-frame structure with a variety of gables, porches and projecting sections.  Its front facade is dominated by a single-story hip-roofed porch supported by tapered square columns, and shelters a pair of entrances.  To the rear of the main block a shotgun house was moved and attached.  It was built in 1908 and is one of a small number of houses surviving from the period in White County.

The house was listed on the National Register of Historic Places in 1991.

References

Houses on the National Register of Historic Places in Arkansas
Houses completed in 1908
Houses in White County, Arkansas
National Register of Historic Places in White County, Arkansas
1908 establishments in Arkansas